Chak Jhumra  (Punjabi: چک جُھمرہ), is a town, railway junction, and Tehsil in Punjab, Pakistan. The town is situated about  Northeast of Faisalabad on Faisalabad-Sangla Hill Road. The Khanewal–Wazirabad Branch and Sangla Hill–Kundian Branch intersect in the town and connect it to Faisalabad and Sargodha respectively.

Prior to the establishment of Pakistan, the town was known as a hub of the cotton trade. At the time, three cotton grinding factories operated within the town. Following the Partition of India, the town's Hindu population, of which the majority of traders were a part of, immigrated to India, causing business to decline significantly.

Beginning in the 1960s, the town began to again experience economic growth and development of infrastructure. At this time a number of schools, hospitals, and textile factories were constructed within the town.

Today, textile manufacturing is the dominant industry within Chak Jhumra.

Education
The following educational institutes are established within Chak Jhumra:

Colleges
 Govt. Higher secondary College 
 Sandal College
 Al Falah College
 Govt. Degree College, Chak Jhumra
 Govt. Degree College for Woman 
 Bloomstar School System
 Wisdom Public School and College

Schools
Misali Ravain high school
 Eden Hall Grammar High & Montessori School System (R) Madni Park Jhumra City.
 Eden Hall Grammar High & Montessori School System
 Govt. High School Railway Road Chak jhumra Near Nadra office and Post Office Chak Jhumra, Formerly Govt. Elementary Chak Jhumra.
 Dar-e-Arqam School
 Bloomstar school system
 Allied School Jhumra
 Alfalah School System
 Global Group of Schools
 City School Chak Jhumra
Timberlandians Student Club, Lakarwala.
1 number school

References

External links

Cities and towns in Faisalabad District
Tehsil municipal administrations of Faisalabad
Tehsils of Punjab, Pakistan